Teodor Ilić Češljar was a Serbian late baroque painter from Vojvodina (then part of the Austrian Empire) best known for being the creator of the Royal Doors from Ostojićevo.

Biography
Češljar was born in 1746 in Čurug and died on November 20, 1793, at age 47 in Bačko Petrovo Selo (both now in Serbia). It is assumed that he learned to paint from famous masters of Timișoara and Novi Sad, where he lived in 1769. His first known work was a painting of four evangelists on church belfry in Buda in 1776 on which he worked together with colleague painter Mihailo Skokolović. According to so some older biographers, Češljar enrolled in Academy of Fine Arts Vienna in 1786. He worked on his first iconostasis in 1789 in the church of Mokrin; after that, he worked in Velika Kikinda and Stara Kanjiža in 1791, and in Bačko Petrovo Selo from 1792 to 1793, when he died. Alongside this, he drew several icons for the lower church in Sremski Karlovci and iconostasis of Kovilj monastery which was destroyed in 1848.

According to quotes from Teodor Ilić Češljar biographies,
he was a great colorist and exceptionally inventive in composure. He didn't always paint in the style of baroque. He, as his coeval, leaned to softer and more gentle colors, silky facture glaze painting just like French masters of Rococo. There is no accurate information about all of the portraits painted by Teodor Ilić Češljar, but it is certain that his works include portraits of bishop Pavle Avakumović (1789), portrait of an unknown priest (National Museum of Serbia), portrait of Josif Jovanović Šakabenta (1787, Museum of Vršac) and large number of ecclesiastical portraits. On these portraits, Češljar proved to be a master of drawing and also a subtle and aesthetic colorist as he did with icons. 

His famous painting of Saint Barbara Anguish (1785) was drawn for Bishop of Nagyvárad. It shows his great sense of composition. This canvas is reminiscent of Venetian decorative painters. Two wall paintings in Kikinda show even more intentions for Venetian painting. They are The Last Supper and Christ in Eclat.

A street in Kikinda is named after him.

See also
 List of Serbian painters

References

External links
Painting by Češljar

1746 births
1793 deaths
People from Žabalj
Serbian painters
Baroque painters
18th-century Serbian people
Academy of Fine Arts Vienna alumni
Habsburg Serbs